Duo Reunion is an album by saxophonist Archie Shepp and pianist Horace Parlan which was recorded in Holland in 1987 and released on the L+R label.

Reception

The AllMusic review by Ron Wynn said "One of the better, more moving sax/piano duos of the 70s reunite effectively".

Track listing
 "Sophisticated Lady" (Duke Ellington) – 7:47
 "Cousin Flo" (Archie Shepp) – 5:10
 "A Flower Is a Lonesome Thing" (Billy Strayhorn) – 8:42
 "Call Me" (Copyright Control) – 6:44
 "Pannonica" (Thelonious Monk) – 9:41
 "When Lights Are Low" (Benny Carter) – 6:42
 "Stardust" (Hoagy Carmichael) – 8:21

Personnel
Archie Shepp – tenor saxophone
Horace Parlan – piano

References

Archie Shepp albums
Horace Parlan albums
1987 albums